Wabash Cannonball was a steel roller coaster at the now-defunct Opryland USA theme park in Nashville, Tennessee. Built by Arrow Development in 1975, it was the second roller coaster added to the park following the Timber Topper. Located in the State Fair section of the park, the ride was built in an area previously occupied by the park's buffalo exhibit.

In accordance to Opryland's musical theme, the ride was named after The Wabash Cannonball, an American folk song about a mythical steam locomotive. Following the Opryland's closure in 1997, Wabash Cannonball was disassembled and sold to Premier Parks. After being stored at Old Indiana Fun Park in Thorntown, Indiana for several years, the ride was scrapped in 2003.

Layout
Wabash Cannonball was a stock model roller coaster manufactured by Arrow Dynamics, a clone of Knott's Berry Farm's Corkscrew.

The ride began when the train rolled out of the station into a short U-turn. Following the turn was the  lift hill. Once the train was at the top of the hill, the train dipped down again into a banked turn. The banked turn then took riders down toward the first drop, which gave a sensation of airtime. Following the drop, the train then ascends a small hill and goes down a turn towards the double corkscrew element.

Following the signature double corkscrew element, the train then went through another U-turn into the brake run.

References

Former roller coasters in Tennessee